Jeffrey is a 2016 Dominican Republic documentary film about a young man's struggle to become a professional reggaeton singer, directed by Yanillys Perez. It was screened in the Discovery section at the 2016 Toronto International Film Festival.

References

External links
 

2016 films
2016 documentary films
Dominican Republic documentary films
2010s Spanish-language films
2016 directorial debut films
Documentary films about music and musicians
Reggaeton